David Eryl Corbet Yale, Hon. QC (31 March 1928 – 26 June 2021) was a scholar in the history of English law. He was Reader in English legal history at Cambridge University from 1969 to 1993, and was a life fellow at Christ's College from 1950 until his death.

The son of Lieutenant Colonel John Corbert Yale (1898-1941), he was raised in British India and educated at Queens' College, Cambridge, where he studied law. His grandfather was Colonel James Corbet Yale of the Hong Kong and Singapore Royal Artillery, and lived at Plas yn Yale, Wales. Upon graduating in 1949 with a starred first and then completing a postgraduate LLB in 1950, he was elected a fellow at Christ's College, Cambridge. He was a lecturer at the University of Cambridge from 1952 until his promotion to a readership in 1969. He was a former Literary Director and President of the Selden Society (the latter from 1994 to 1997), which in 1999 instituted the David Yale Prize in his honour, awarded biennially to a young scholar (under the age of 35) for a distinguished contribution to the laws and legal institutions of England and Wales.

Yale was elected a Fellow of the British Academy in 1980 and was appointed an honorary Queen's Counsel for England and Wales in 2000.

He died on 26 June 2021, at the age of 93.

References

External links
 

1928 births
2021 deaths
Legal historians
Fellows of Christ's College, Cambridge
Alumni of Queens' College, Cambridge
Fellows of the British Academy
Honorary King's Counsel
Legal scholars of the University of Cambridge
British people in colonial India